For information on all University of Central Arkansas sports, see Central Arkansas Bears and Sugar Bears
 For information about the Central Arkansas men's team, see Central Arkansas Bears basketball.

The Central Arkansas Sugar Bears basketball team is the women's basketball team that represents the University of Central Arkansas (UCA) in Conway, Arkansas. The Sugar Bears compete in the ASUN Conference. They completed a 15-season tenure in the Southland Conference in 2020–21. The Sugar Bears are coached by Sandra Rushing.

Postseason
 Division I:  At the NCAA Division I level, the Sugar Bears have competed in two NCAA tournaments with a combined record of 0–2 (2016 and 2017).  The Sugar Bears have competed in one WNIT with a record of 0–1 (2012).  The team has competed in two Women's Basketball Invitational tournament with a record of 3–2 (2011 and 2018).
 Division II:  The Sugar Bears competed in six NCAA Division II tournaments with a combined record of 8–4 (1996, 2003, 2004, and 2005).  The 2003 and 2005 teams competed at the Elite Eight level. 
 NAIA:  As an NAIA member, Central Arkansas competed in two national tournaments (1984 and 1991); two Bi-District Playoff tournaments (1984 and 1985); and one Area V Regional tournament (1983).  The overall record for NAIA postseason play was 2–4.

NCAA Division II
The Sugar Bears made five appearances in the NCAA Division II women's basketball tournament. They had a combined record of 10–5.

NAIA Division I
The Sugar Bears made two appearances in the NAIA Division I women's basketball tournament, with a combined record of 1–2.

See also
Central Arkansas Bears basketball

References

External links